The TKB-408 Korobov was a bullpup assault rifle prototype by Soviet designer German A. Korobov presented in 1946. The TKB-408 was submitted to a set of official trials conducted in 1946 to select an assault rifle for the Red Army. The Soviet Army commission found it unsatisfactory, with the trials eventually selecting Mikhail Kalashnikov's AK-47.

Characteristics 
The TKB-408 is gas operated, with locked breech action, with a vertically tilting bolt to lock the barrel. It can be fired on semi- or full-automatic. Its cocking handle is located at the left side of the weapon, above the wooden handguard, being non-reciprocating. The firing mode selector is located on the left side of the receiver, above the pistol grip. A separate safety switch is located within the trigger guard, in front of the trigger. The design incorporates no provisions for firing from the left shoulder. The ejection port is located at the right side of the weapon, above the magazine; having a flip-down dust cover.

Caliber 
The TKB-408 is chambered in the Soviet 7.62×39mm M43 intermediate round and has an overall length of 790 mm. It used proprietary magazines, made from sheet steel, with each magazine holding 30 rounds, with a forward projection that entered the magazine lock, located at the bottom of the pistol grip. The Korobov was mostly made of stamped steel, with wooden buttstock and handguard.

In popular culture 
In the cancelled post-apocalyptic RPG game Nuclear Union, the protagonist is shown carrying the TKB-408. According to in-game lore, the Korobov was revived when counter-revolutionary gangs found the documentation and the weapon began appearing in the regions of Ryazan and Tambov; the deficiencies of the weapon were corrected with it being referred to as "Object 93" (Ob'yekt 93) in reference to the year its schematics were discovered.

See also
AO-46
TKB-517
TKB-059
TKB-0146
Dlugov assault rifle
List of bullpup firearms

References

 Oruzhie Magazine, Page 9, Issue 5 1998 & Issue 6 1998.

External links

 World Guns article on the TKB-408

7.62×39mm assault rifles
Trial and research firearms of the Soviet Union
Bullpup rifles
Abandoned military projects of the Soviet Union